The Sweden national bandy team represents Sweden in the sport of bandy. There are two separate national teams, a national bandy team for men, and a national bandy team for women. This article deals chiefly with Sweden's national men's bandy team.

Sweden has been playing friendlies against Finland and Norway since the early 20th century. In 1907 and 1909 there were also occasional games against Russia and Denmark. The games were set up informally from 1907 and in official internationals from 1919. Agreements were made to play friendlies against Soviet Union in the late 1940s, but the plans did not come to realization.

Finland, Norway and Sweden played bandy at the Winter Olympics in Oslo in 1952. After having seen them there, the Soviet Union invited these three countries to a four nation bandy tournament in 1954. This was the first time a Soviet national bandy team met other national bandy teams. The four countries used somewhat different rules prior to this tournament, but the rules were adjusted to be the same for the future. Sweden won the tournament.

Sweden has been taking part in the bandy world championships since the start in 1957. The team has never finished worse than third place (which once, in 1957, meant last place) and has won the championship 12 times .

In the 2009 World Championship Sweden won in the final against Russia. Sweden repeated the victory in the 2010 World Championships, this time in Moscow, the first time Sweden has won a bandy world championship in the capital of Russia. This was the tenth victory in the world championships for Sweden.

Sweden won the Rossiya Tournament in 1974 and 1990 and has won its successor Russian Government Cup in 1994, 1996 and 2003.

The record for senior men's senior team appearances for the Swedish national bandy team is held by former Borlänge/Stora Tuna BK, Falu BS, Västerås SK Bandy, IFK Vänersborg, Sandvikens AIK and Tillberga IK Bandy player Per Fosshaug, who played for the team 129 times.

World Championship record

Current squad 
Swedish squad at the 2014 World Championship in Irkutsk, Russia, January 26 – February 2, 2014.

References

 
National bandy teams
Bandy in Sweden
Bandy World Championship-winning countries